Alpha-actinin-3, also known as alpha-actinin skeletal muscle isoform 3 or F-actin cross-linking protein, is a protein that in humans is encoded by the ACTN3 gene (named sprinter gene, speed gene or athlete gene) located on chromosome 11. All people have two copies (alleles) of this gene.

Alpha-actinin is an actin-binding protein with multiple roles in different cell types. This gene expression is limited to skeletal muscle. It is localized to the Z-disc and analogous dense bodies, where it helps to anchor the myofibrillar actin filaments.

Fast versus slow twitch muscle fibers 

Skeletal muscle is composed of long cylindrical cells called muscle fibers. There are two types of muscle fibers, slow twitch or muscle contraction (type I) and fast twitch (type II). Slow twitch fibers are more efficient in using oxygen to generate energy, while fast twitch fibers are less efficient. However, fast twitch fibers fire more rapidly, allowing them to generate more power than slow twitch (type I) fibers. Fast twitch fibers and slow twitch fibers are also called white muscle fibers and red muscles fibers, respectively. The alpha-actinin-3 protein is found in type II muscle fibers.

Alleles 

An allele (rs1815739; 577X) has been identified in the ACTN3 gene which results in a deficiency of alpha-actinin-3 in the individuals. The X homozygous genotype (ACTN3 577XX) is caused by a C to T transition in exon 16 of the ACTN3 gene, which causes a transformation of an arginine base (R) to a premature stop codon (X) resulting in the rs1815739 mutation causing no production of the alpha-actinin 3 protein in muscle fibers. The 577XX polymorphism causes no production of alpha-actinin 3 protein which is essential in fast twitch muscle fibers.

It has been speculated that variations in this gene evolved to accommodate the energy expenditure requirements of people in various parts of the world. Over 75% of the persons have one or two copies of ACTN3 577R and have alpha-actinin-3. Homozygous individuals (ACTN3 577XX) have no alpha-actinin-3 (16%-20% of the population), but they have a high level of alpha-actinin-2.

Athletes 
There is an association between the ACTN3 R577X polymorphism in sprint and powerlifting performance at an elite level (RR and RX variants are better), and appears to be an association with exercise recovery and lower injury risk.  It appears that the XX genotype is associated with higher levels of muscle damage and a longer time required for recovery.

Interactions 

ACTN3 has been shown to interact with alpha-actinin-2.

See also 
 Actinin

References

Further reading

External links 
 

Genes on human chromosome 11
EF-hand-containing proteins